Houameuang District  is a district (muang) of Houaphanh province in northeastern Laos.

References

Districts of Houaphanh province